Narayanpur (also spelled Narainpur) is a village in Narayanpur block CD block in the Jamtara Sadar subdivision of the Jamtara district in the Indian state of Jharkhand.

Geography

Location

Overview
The map shows a large area, which is a plateau with low hills, except in the eastern portion where the Rajmahal hills intrude into this area and the Ramgarh hills are there. The south-western portion is just a rolling upland. The entire area is overwhelmingly rural with only small pockets of urbanisation.

Note: The full screen map is interesting. All places marked on the map are linked in the full screen map and one can easily move on to another page of his/her choice. Enlarge the full screen map to see what else is there – one gets railway connections, many more road connections and so on.

Area

Demographics
According to the 2011 Census of India, Naryanpur had a total population of 2,655, of which 1,357 (51%) were males and 1,298 (49%) were females. Population in the age range 0–6 years was 435. The total number of literate persons in Narayanpur was 2,220 (66.89% of the population over 6 years).

Civic administration

Police station
There is a police station at Narayanpur.

CD block HQ
Headquarters of Narayanpur CD block is at Narayanpur village.

Education
Kasturba Gandhi Balika Vidyalaya, Narayanpur, is a Hindi-medium girls only institution established in 2005. It has facilities for teaching from class VI to class XII.

Government High School Narayanpur is a Hindi-medium coeducational institution established in 1957. It has facilities for teaching from class IX to class XII.

References

Villages in Jamtara district